Jonas af Jochnick (21 May 1937 – 16 May 2019) was a Swedish businessman, most notable for co-founding Oriflame Cosmetics with his brother Robert af Jochnick in 1967 in Sweden.  In 2003 the brothers shared the International Swede of the Year award. As of 2006, Jonas af Jochnick was Sweden's 19th wealthiest person as estimated by business magazine Veckans Affärer.

See also
List of multi-level marketing companies

References

External links
Official website

Swedish businesspeople
1937 births
2019 deaths
People associated with direct selling